The Immediate Geographic Region of Carangola is one of the 10 immediate geographic regions in the Intermediate Geographic Region of Juiz de Fora, one of the 70 immediate geographic regions in the Brazilian state of Minas Gerais and one of the 509 of Brazil, created by the National Institute of Geography and Statistics (IBGE) in 2017.

Municipalities 
It comprises 9 municipalities.

 Caiana    
 Carangola   
 Divino      
 Espera Feliz     
 Faria Lemos     
 Orizânia      
 Pedra Bonita    
 Pedra Dourada     
 Tombos

References 

Geography of Minas Gerais